Marquette is an unincorporated community in Bureau County, Illinois, United States, located on Illinois Route 29, east of De Pue.

References

Unincorporated communities in Bureau County, Illinois
Unincorporated communities in Illinois